Tyrone Bernard Calico (born November 9, 1980) is a former American football wide receiver in the National Football League (NFL). In college, he was the starting receiver for Middle Tennessee State University.

College career
Calico made 65 receptions during his freshman season and finished third single season receptions in school history. As a sophomore, he had 47 catches for 752 yards with three touchdowns. On October 28, 2000, Calico caught three passes for 89-yards and two touchdowns during a 61-35 loss to Mississippi State. During the game, Calico made a one-handed 42-yard reception on the sideline as he was covered by three defenders including Fred Smoot. He was able to split the defenders and raced down the sideline for a touchdown. This catch was voted the best catch of the 2000 season and an old painting depicting the catch is hung in the college football hall of fame. As a junior, he had 37 catches for 583 yards with five touchdowns.  He bounced back as a senior with 45 catches for 606 yards with four touchdowns.

Professional career
Calico accepted his invitation to the 2003 Senior Bowl and helped the North defeat the South 24-21. He attended the NFL Combine and was impressive after running the 40-yard dash in times ranging from 4.34-4.42. This greatly raised his draft stock and NFL analyst Gil Brandt projected him to be a first round pick in the upcoming draft, with the possibility of going to the Tennessee Titans at 28th overall. At the conclusion of the pre-draft process, the majority of scouts and NFL draft experts projected him to be a second round pick. He was ranked the seventh best wide receiver prospect in the draft by NFLDraftScout.com.

The Tennessee Titans selected him in the second round (60th overall) of the 2003 NFL Draft. He was the highest selection taken from Middle Tennessee State. Calico was also the 19th player ever drafted from Middle Tennessee State.

He recorded four touchdowns in his rookie season.

After a knee injury caused by an illegal horse-collar tackle from Roy Williams, he was cut by the Titans after 2005. 

On May 13, 2008, he was signed by the Calgary Stampeders of the Canadian Football League. He was released in June 2008.

In July, 2021, Calico was honored with a 99 Overall card in Madden 21’s online game mode Madden Ultimate Team.

Notes and references

External links
 Player Bio at nfl.com

1980 births
Living people
Sportspeople from Orange County, California
People from Millington, Tennessee
Players of American football from Tennessee
American football wide receivers
Middle Tennessee Blue Raiders football players
Tennessee Titans players
Players of American football from California